John H. Francis Polytechnic High School is a secondary school located in the Sun Valley neighborhood of Los Angeles, California, United States. It serves grades 9 through 12 and is a part of the Los Angeles Unified School District. Despite its name, Polytechnic is a comprehensive high school.

History 
Polytechnic High School opened in 1897 as a "commercial branch" of the only high school at that time in the city, the Los Angeles High School. As such, Polytechnic is the second oldest high school in the city. The school's original campus was located in downtown Los Angeles on South Beaudry Avenue, the present location of the Los Angeles Unified School District (LAUSD) Board of Education headquarters.

In 1905, Metropolitan Polytechnic moved to the south side of Washington Boulevard at the corner of Flower Street in downtown Los Angeles, across Washington from old St. Vincent's College. Poly was the first school to offer studies in multiple class subjects, which is now modeled by many high schools, as “periods.” In 1935, its name was changed to “John H. Francis Polytechnic” to honor the founding principal.

In February 1957, Polytechnic moved to its present site in the San Fernando Valley and opened its doors to new students for the then fast growing suburb. Since Poly's relocation, the former site has been the campus of Los Angeles Trade–Technical College. The school mascot is a parrot named Joe Parrot, and he now has a female companion named Josie.

It was in the Los Angeles City High School District until 1961, when it merged into LAUSD.

In 2006, the establishment of Arleta High School and Panorama High School relieved much of the overcrowding at Polytechnic.
The 2009 opening of Sun Valley High School additionally relieved overcrowding.

Poly's basketball gym is named for NBA Hall-of-Famer Gail Goodrich, a Poly alumnus. The Parrots have had a longtime rivalry with both Van Nuys High School and North Hollywood High School.

Notable alumni

 Bessie Bruington Burke (1918), first Black principal in Los Angeles Public Schools
 Carl David Anderson, recipient of the 1936 Nobel Prize in Physics
 Tom Bradley (1937), 38th Mayor of Los Angeles (1973–1993)
 Helen Gurley Brown (1939), author, publisher, and businesswoman; founded Cosmopolitan magazine and was its editor in chief 1965–1997
 Ike Danning,  Major League Baseball player
 Hideo Date, painter
 Bill Davila: first Mexican-American to preside over a supermarket chain
 Marcellite Garner (1928), voice actress of Minnie Mouse
 D. J. Gay (2007), basketball player
 J. Paul Getty, international petroleum businessman, "World's Richest Man".
 Gail Goodrich (1961), basketball player in the NBA, attended UCLA
 William Hung (2001), "American Idol" singer
 Fay M. Jackson (1920), African-American journalist and publicist
 George A. Kasem (1938), Democratic US Representative for California's 25th congressional district (1959–1961)
 Bob Kuwahara (1921), animator
 Joseph Thomas McGucken, Archbishop of San Francisco from 1962-1977
 Tanya Neiman (1966), lawyer in San Francisco
 John W. Olmsted (1915), Professor Emeritus at University of California, Riverside
 Stephen Paddock (1971), perpetrator of the 2017 Las Vegas shooting
 Greg Palast (left for college in 1969), investigative journalist
 Bruce Pardo (1981), perpetrator of the 2008 Covina massacre
 Milton Quon (1932), animator, artist and actor
 Stanley Mark Rifkin (born in 1946), convicted criminal in the United States responsible for stealing $10.2 million through wire transfer via telephone in the autumn of 1978. At the time, it was the largest bank theft in U.S. history.
 Peter Senge (1965), author, scientist, and director of the Center for Organizational Learning at MIT
 Vaino Spencer (1938), judge
 Herbert R. Temple Jr. (1947), Lieutenant General and Chief of the National Guard Bureau, 1986–1990
 Sloppy Thurston, starting pitcher in Major League Baseball
 Danny Trejo, actor
 Paul R. Williams, architect
 Alan K.Lohr, Los Angeles DJ & Talk show host, former KROQ 106.7 in the late 70s'

Notable faculty
 Arthur E. Briggs: Los Angeles City Council member, 1939–1941, taught law at night
 Ralph Jesson: football coach at Polytechnic (1924–1928)

References

External links

 John H. Francis Polytechnic High School

Educational institutions established in 1897
Los Angeles Unified School District schools
High schools in the San Fernando Valley
Polytechnic
Public high schools in California
Sun Valley, Los Angeles
1897 establishments in California